Victoria University (VU or Vic Uni) is a public research university based in Melbourne, Victoria, Australia. It is a dual-sector university, providing courses in both higher education and technical and further education (TAFE).

The university has several campuses in Melbourne Central Business District, Melbourne Western Region, and in Sydney, comprising six academic colleges, six research institutes, seven research centres and VU's Victoria Polytechnic.

History
The idea for a technical school based in the western suburbs of Melbourne was first proposed in 1910. The Footscray Technical School opened its doors to 220 students and 9 teachers in 1916 after five years of fundraising.

Charles Archibald Hoadley was the school's principal from its founding until his death in 1947. Under Hoadley's leadership, the school expanded and began offering trade certificate courses, diplomas in architecture, building, and contracting, as well as evening classes. War and the Depression saw a dip in student numbers. However, by 1943, there were 2500 students enrolled in courses taught at the Footscray Park and Footscray Nicholson campuses.

The following decades saw gender and cultural shifts. In 1958, the school changed its name to the Footscray Technical College. Ten years later, it changed its name again, this time, to the Footscray Institute of Technology (FIT). Women first enrolled in day diploma courses in 1960, and changes to the federal government's immigration policy resulted in many more European and Asian students entering the school. The secondary school component, now known as Footscray City College, was separated from the rest of the institute in 1972. By the mid-1970s, the expanded curriculum included degree courses and was well beyond the technical focus of the original Footscray Technical School. Further changes occurred in the 1980s, with the technical and trade education section separating from FIT to form the Footscray and Newport Colleges of TAFE.

In 1990, FIT merged with the Western Institute, which had been founded three years earlier to provide TAFE and higher education courses to the outlying suburbs in western Melbourne. In 1990, it was established as a university by the Victoria State Parliament as Victoria University of Technology. The university further amalgamation with the Western Melbourne Institute of TAFE in 1998. In 2005, the Victoria University of Technology Act of 1990 was amended to rename the university as Victoria University, reflecting the development of its teaching and research.

The institutions that combined to form VU include:
 Footscray Technical School, renamed Footscray Technical College and later Footscray Institute of Technology
 Newport Technical College, renamed Newport College of TAFE
 Melbourne School of Hairdressing
 School of Painting, Decorating and Sign Crafts
 Melbourne Technical College of Hairdressing
 Melbourne College of Decoration
 Footscray College of TAFE
 Flagstaff College of TAFE
 Western Institute
 Gellibrand College of TAFE, renamed Western Metropolitan College of TAFE
 Western Melbourne Institute of TAFE
 Victoria University of Technology
 Victoria Polytechnic

Campuses
Victoria University has campuses located throughout Melbourne's western region and the city centre. The new VU City Tower will be Melbourne's tallest vertical campus, and is due for completion in 2021. One campus is located in central Sydney.

VU courses are also delivered by partner institutes throughout Asia, including in China, India, Malaysia, and Sri Lanka. Two of the university's largest partners are Sunway University College in Malaysia and Liaoning University in China.

Footscray Park

Footscray Park Campus on Ballarat Road, Footscray is the university's main campus and administrative centre. It offers higher education courses primarily in engineering, education and sport-related disciplines. It occupies a  site overlooking Flemington Racecourse and the Maribyrnong River. A A$68.5 million sport and learning precinct, including sport and exercise science research labs, was completed in early 2011. The campus also has a 25-metre swimming pool and a childcare centre.

St Albans

St Albans Campus on McKecknie Street, St Albans, is the university's health and education hub, with a focus on psychology, nursing, arts, and paramedic and biomedical sciences. The new St Albans Health and Fitness Centre was opened in 2013.

Footscray Nicholson

Footscray Nicholson Campus is in central Footscray, on the corner of Nicholson and Buckley Streets. It delivers TAFE, VCE and short courses. Its new learning commons was opened in 2012 offering a broad range of educational and student services.

City King
City King Campus is now closed. All Victoria University courses delivered in Melbourne's CBD are run through the VU City Campus which consists of the Queen Street Building and the new VU City Tower building, opened in 2022.

The City King Campus is located in a high-rise building close to Southern Cross station. It provides health and beauty courses, and includes a hair and beauty salon that is open to the public.

City Queen

The City Queen Campus occupies two heritage buildings at 283 and 295 Queen Street in the heart of Melbourne's legal precinct. The campus houses the university's College of Law and Justice, a law library, the Sir Zelman Cowen Centre and two moot courts. It offers undergraduate and postgraduate law courses, including continuing legal education courses for legal professionals.

Werribee

The  Werribee Campus is located in the Werribee agricultural research and tertiary education precinct. It offers trades training as well as facilities for water, food and fire safety research.

Sunshine
The Sunshine Campus of Victoria Polytechnic is located on Ballarat Road, Sunshine. It offers TAFE courses, focusing mainly on business and the construction industries. The A$44 million high-technology Construction Hub was opened in 2013 for building and construction training. The campus also has a convention centre with a 200-seat auditorium.

Sydney
Victoria University delivers a number of business courses for international students at its campus in central Sydney, which operates in partnership with the Education Centre of Australia (ECA).

Whitten Oval
In late 2010, VU opened an A$8 million Sport and Recreation Learning Centre in partnership with the Western Bulldogs at the Whitten Oval in West Footscray. The Centre contains massage therapy clinics open to the public, as well as a 140-seat lecture theatre, a library, classrooms and offices.

Organisation

Several of the university's colleges offer internationally recognised qualifications ranging from certificates and diplomas to degrees, postgraduate certificates and diplomas, and masters and doctoral research degrees (PhD). Victoria Polytechnic and VU College offer vocational education courses and higher education diplomas. These are divided between several colleges, including:

 The College of Arts and Education
 The College of Business
The College of Engineering and Science
 The College of Health and Bio-medicine
 The College of Law and Justice
 The College of Sport and Exercise Science
 Victoria University Polytechnic, which is the TAFE division of Victoria University.

Students
In 2019, VU had 43,802 students.  Approximately 65% student in higher education degree programs, and 35% enrolled in TAFE training courses. Of these students, 5,662 were international students studying at one of VU's Melbourne or Sydney Campuses, and 3,772 were international students studying at VU programs overseas at one of its partner organisations located mainly in Asia.

Academia

Rankings
Victoria University ranked in 351–400 in the world in the Times Higher Education World University Rankings 2021.

28 VU research disciplines were ranked at or above world standard in the Excellence in Research Australia (ERA) assessments 2018.

Student accommodation
VU owns and operates student accommodation for students, staff, and guests of the university. In February 2016, the Student Village in Maidstone was replaced with the newly built UniLodge Victoria University, a 13-story apartment building across the road from the Footscray Park Campus on Ballarat Road, Footscray.

International House, a traditional residential college located at the University of Melbourne, also offers places to Victoria University students.

Notable people

Staff
 Tony Birch, poet, novelist, author
 Peter Dixon, economist
 Craig Emerson, former Australian politician
 Gary Foley, Indigenous activist and historian
 Ian Gray, magistrate
 Michael Kirby, retired High Court judge
 Alan Kohler, financial journalist and editor
 Chris Maxwell QC, barrister
 Nyadol Nyuon, lawyer and regular media commentator and advocate for South Sudanese community
 Robert Richter QC, barrister
 Christopher Sonn, social psychologist 
 Robert Stary, criminal law specialist

Alumni

 Sukhbold Sukhee, Permanent Representative to the United Nations for Mongolia
 Ali Abdo, Olympic wrestler
 Liam Adams, long-distance running champion
 Ngconde Balfour, former South African sport and recreation minister
 Ron Barassi, Australian Football League legend
Nathan Brown, former AFL player and commentator
 Marion May Campbell, author and Associate Professor of Professional and Creative Writing at Deakin University
 Doug Chappel, comedian and actor
Bianca Chatfield, netballer, media and sports presenter
 Jeffrey Cheah, founder of the Sunway Group
 Simon Garlick, CEO of the Western Bulldogs
 Andrew Gaze, former basketballer
 Brad Green, former Melbourne footballer and current Carlton Football Club development coach
 Alwyn Jones, national champion triple jumper
 Alan Kohler, financial journalist
 Telmo Languiller, Victorian MP
 Tammy Lobato, Victorian MP
 Mike McKay, Olympian and member of the "Oarsome Foursome"
 Pia Miranda, actress
Danny Morseu, first Torres Strait Islander to represent Australia at the Olympics
Nyadol Nyuon, litigation lawyer and regular media commentator and advocate for South Sudanese community
 Campbell Rose, former CEO of the Western Bulldogs
 Larry Sengstock, former basketballer
 Fatai Veamatahau, finalist in The Voice, 2012
 Mitch Wallis, footballer, Western Bulldogs
 Kim Wells, Victoria State Government Treasurer
Deepak Vinayak, Community Leader, Melbourne
Easton Wood, Western Bulldogs AFL premiership captain

See also

List of universities in Australia

References

Further reading
 Rasmussen, Carolyn (1989), Poor Man's University: 75 years of Technical Education in Footscray, Melbourne: The Press of the Footscray Institute of Technology 
 90 Years, 90 Legends (2006), Melbourne: Published by Victoria University

External links

 
Australian vocational education and training providers
Universities in Melbourne
TAFE Colleges in Melbourne
1990 establishments in Australia
Educational institutions established in 1990
Universities established in the 1990s